Tylersville (also known as Pug Muncy) is an unincorporated community in central West Chester Township, Butler County, Ohio, United States.  It was laid out in 1842 by Daniel Pocock and named for the President of the United States at the time, John Tyler.  Its name lives on in a major road of northern West Chester Township, which is at Exit 22 on I-75.

References

Further reading
Butler County Engineer's Office.  Butler County Official Transportation Map, 2003.  Fairfield Township, Butler County, Ohio:  The Office, 2003.
A History and Biographical Cyclopaedia of Butler County, Ohio with Illustrations and Sketches of Its Representative Men and Pioneers.  Cincinnati, Ohio:  Western Biographical Publishing Company, 1882. 

Populated places established in 1842
Unincorporated communities in Butler County, Ohio
Unincorporated communities in Ohio